Gregory Brian Shapiro (born December 16, 1972) is an American producer. He won an Academy Award in the category Best Picture for the film The Hurt Locker.

Selected filmography 
 The Hurt Locker (2009; co-won with Kathryn Bigelow, Mark Boal and Nicolas Chartier)

References

External links 

1972 births
Living people
People from Los Angeles
American film producers
Film producers from California
Producers who won the Best Picture Academy Award
Filmmakers who won the Best Film BAFTA Award